Music for Your Movies is an EP by Pram, released on 18 November 1996 through Duophonic Records.

Track listing

Personnel 
Rosie Cuckston – vocals, keyboards, omnichord
Matt Eaton - guitar, bass guitar, sampler, keyboards
Sam Owen –  guitar, bass guitar, keyboards, accordion
Max Simpson – keyboards, sampler
Daren Garratt – drums, percussion
The Colonel – theremin

References

External links 
 

1996 EPs
Pram (band) albums